Skierbieszów  is a village in Zamość County, Lublin Voivodeship, in eastern Poland. It is the seat of the gmina (administrative district) called Gmina Skierbieszów. The village has a population of 1,317. There is a castle in the village.

In 1428 the village was given to the bishop Jan Zborowski of Clan of Ostoja and 1453 the village was given rights by the King as a Town. Skierbieszow was a town until 1822 and the coat of arms of the town/village is of Ostoja.

In November 1942 during the Nazi occupation of Poland, the Polish inhabitants of Skierbieszów were expelled from Skierbieszów to make room for German settlers. Former German President Horst Köhler was born in the village during the occupation. The village was briefly renamed Heidenstein until the arrival of Soviet forces in 1944. In 1945-46 the Polish residents began returning to their homes.

External links
Skierbieszów website

References

Villages in Zamość County
Ruthenian Voivodeship
Kholm Governorate
Lublin Voivodeship (1919–1939)